Bülent Korkmaz (born 24 November 1968), colloquially known by his given nicknames "Büyük Kaptan" and "Cengaver", is a Turkish former professional footballer and current manager of TFF First League club Çaykur Rizespor.

Korkmaz was a one club man during his club career, playing as a centre-back for Galatasaray for his whole career for 18 consecutive seasons between 1987 and 2005, winning 8 Süper Lig, 6 Turkish Cup, 5 Turkish Super Cup,1 UEFA Cup and 1 UEFA Super Cup titles.

He is the 13th player in history to make over 100 appearances across European club competitions.

Korkmaz has got 102 senior caps for Turkey national football team.

Club career
Korkmaz started his career at Galatasaray Futbol Akademisi as a goalkeeper in 1979. He changed his field role to become a defender following the advise from his youth coach. He was offered a professional contract by German club Bayer Leverkusen at the age of 16 but he chose to stay at Galatasaray and he was eventually promoted to senior squad in 1987.

Korkmaz was a part of squad reaching semi-finals of 1988–89 edition of UEFA European Cup. During the 2000 UEFA Cup Final between Galatasaray and Arsenal, he dislocated his shoulder but he declined to quit the game, continued the game until the end following in-field physio treatment where Galatasaray won the cup after extra time. However, the injury caused Korkmaz eventually to miss UEFA Euro 2000 competition.

Korkmaz was invited to play at "FIFA XI" squad against the 2002 FIFA World Cup hosts "Japan & Korea XI" at World Dream soccer exhibition, held at Yokohama International Stadium on 3 January 2001.

International career
Korkmaz was part of the Turkey national team that finished third at the 2002 FIFA World Cup and, in 2003, had the same finishing position at the FIFA Confederations Cup. Korkmaz also represented Turkey in EURO 96.

Coaching career
On 30 August 2005, Korkmaz was appointed as the assistant manager at Gençlerbirliği S.K., and resigned during the same season. In January 2007, he signed in Kayseri Erciyesspor as head coach while the team were sitting at the bottom of the ladder. Under Korkmaz's management, Kayseri Erciyesspor reached the final of 2006–07 Turkish Cup, losing 0–1 to Beşiktaş J.K., however; spotting 17th position, they relegated at the end of the season.

On 23 February 2009, after the leaving of Michael Skibbe, Korkmaz was appointed as the head coach of Galatasaray. Putting a performance of 7 wins out of 15 official games, his was sacked by the club in June 2009.

On 8 November 2011, after the resignation of Yücel İldiz, Korkmaz joined Karabükspor as the head coach. Taking the team over from 16th position of standings, he managed the team to finish the season at 12th place, for a safe avoiding the relegation. In same season, Karabükspor reached semi-finals at 2011–12 Turkish Cup, for the first time at club's history.

On 13 November 2012, Korkmaz replaced Carlos Carvalhal at İstanbul Büyükşehir Belediyespor. His contract was mutually terminated after his team got relegated as of 30 May 2013.

Style of play and reception
Korkmaz was described as "an aggressive and powerful defender" by Bleacher Report, in 2014. Ozan Kabak, another home-grown Galatasaray player, expressed that he idolised Korkmaz, in 2020.

Personal life
Korkmaz was born in Malatya in 1968. His younger brother, Mert Korkmaz (born 1971) is also a former professional footballer, played also for Galatasaray and holds 5 caps for Turkey. Korkmaz is married with 2 daughters.

Career statistics

Club
Source:

International
Source:

Managerial statistics

Honours
Turkey
FIFA World Cup third-place: 2002
FIFA Confederations Cup third-place: 2003

Galatasaray
UEFA Cup: 1999–2000
UEFA Super Cup: 2000
Süper Lig (8): 1987–88, 1992–93, 1993–94, 1996–97, 1997–98, 1998–99, 1999–00, 2001–02
Turkish Cup (6): 1990–91, 1992–93, 1995–96, 1998–99, 1999–2000, 2004–05
Turkish Super Cup: 1988, 1991, 1993, 1996, 1997
Chancellor Cup: 1990, 1995
TSYD Cup (6): 1987–88, 1991–92, 1992–93, 1997–98, 1998–99, 1999–2000

See also
 List of men's footballers with 100 or more international caps
 List of one-club men

References

External links
 
  
 
 Profile at galatasaray.org 

1968 births
Living people
Sportspeople from Malatya
Association football defenders
Galatasaray S.K. footballers
Süper Lig players
UEFA Euro 1996 players
2002 FIFA World Cup players
2003 FIFA Confederations Cup players
Turkish footballers
Turkey international footballers
FIFA Century Club
Turkish football managers
Süper Lig managers
Kayseri Erciyesspor managers
Expatriate football managers in Azerbaijan
Bursaspor managers
Gençlerbirliği S.K. managers
Galatasaray S.K. (football) managers
Alanyaspor managers
Turkey under-21 international footballers
UEFA Cup winning players
Turkish expatriate football managers
Çaykur Rizespor managers